This is a list of American films released in 1970.

Patton won the Academy Award for Best Picture.

The top-grossing film at the U.S. box office was Airport.



A–B

C–F

G–I

J–M

N–S

T–Z

See also
 1970 in the United States

External links

 1970 films at the Internet Movie Database
 List of 1970 box office number-one films in the United States

1970
Films
Lists of 1970 films by country or language